George Young (1847 – 20 April 1935) was a New Zealand cricketer. He played in two first-class matches for Canterbury from 1866 to 1868.

See also
 List of Canterbury representative cricketers

References

External links
 

1847 births
1935 deaths
New Zealand cricketers
Canterbury cricketers
People from Ghazipur